Tagum Cooperative is one of the largest cooperatives in Mindanao, Philippines as it is classified by the Cooperative Development Authority (CDA) of the Philippines as a large cooperative . It is composed of over 117, 000 members as of June 2015 coming from Tagum City, Davao del Norte and towns and cities throughout Region XI and in CARAGA region.

History

It was branded a Finance Organization achieving Certified Credit Union Standards (FOCCUS) in the year 2000 by the World Council of Credit Unions (WOCCU), based in the United States of America (USA), through its outreaching- cooperative program office in the Philippines, popularly known as the Credit Union Empowerment and Strengthening (CUES)- Philippines.

Cooperative highlights and financial standing

Affiliations
National Confederation of Cooperatives (NATCCO) 
Mindanao Alliance of Self-help Societies- Southern Philippines Educational Cooperative Center (MASS-SPECC)
Model Cooperative Network (MCN)
CLIMBS Life & General Insurance Cooperative
Credit Union Trainers for Empowernment (CUTE)
Metro South Coop Bank
Asian Confederation of Credit Unions (ACCU)
One of the 15 partner co-ops in the GE Project in the Philippines that was implemented by the Asian Women in Co-operative Development Forum (AWCF) from 2010-2012, supported by the Swedish Cooperative Centre (SCC).

Cooperative service networks

Main office
Its main office is located along Dalisay Road, Magugpo West, Tagum City

References

Cooperatives in the Philippines
Tagum